Stephen Anthony Cusack FRS is Head of the European Molecular Biology Laboratory (EMBL) site in Grenoble, France.

Education
Cusack was educated at Imperial College London where he was awarded a PhD in 1976 for research on the Radial distribution function and electron density in metals.

Awards and honours
Cusack was elected a Fellow of the Royal Society (FRS) in 2015. His certificate of election reads: 

In 1998, Cusack was elected as a member of the European Molecular Biology Organization.

References

Year of birth missing (living people)
Living people
British molecular biologists
Members of the European Molecular Biology Organization
Fellows of the Royal Society
Alumni of Imperial College London